Robert Adolphus Warren (1886–1963) was an English professional footballer who played as a forward.

References

1886 births
1963 deaths
People from Newhall, Derbyshire
Footballers from Derbyshire
English footballers
Association football forwards
Derby County F.C. players
Burton United F.C. players
Grimsby Town F.C. players
Shrewsbury Town F.C. players
Newhall Swifts F.C. players
English Football League players